Yuki Bhambri was the defending champion, but he did not participate that year.
Bradley Klahn won the title, defeating Jarmere Jenkins in the final, 7–6(7–5), 6–1.

Seeds

Draw

Finals

Top half

Bottom half

References
 Main Draw
  Qualifying Draw

Latrobe City Traralgon ATP Challenger 1 - Singles
2014 Singles
Latrobe City Traralgon ATP Challenger 1 - Singles